Greater Bridgeport Transit (GBT) is a transit service serving the Greater Bridgeport region of the U.S. state of Connecticut. GBT provides local bus service to the cities/towns of Bridgeport, Trumbull, Stratford, Milford, Fairfield, Westport, Shelton, and Monroe. The fleet is composed of mainly  New Flyer Xcelsior and New Flyer Low Floor, as well as Gillig Low Floor and two Proterra Catalyst BE40 models.

Ticketing
GBT uses a system called ZipTrip for fare collection. This acts as any other pass or transfer would, permitting free, unlimited rides in any direction until expiration. It was first introduced in 2007, prior to which payment was made in cash or tokens. Tokens may still be purchased at the GBT hub adjacent to the Bridgeport Metro North Railroad station.

Coastal Link (Route 2) 
The Coastal Link, formerly Route 2, provides service from Connecticut Post Mall in Milford, Connecticut,  to the Wheels Hub in Norwalk, Connecticut. The service runs in conjunction with Norwalk Transit District and Milford Transit District, using their buses as well. Frequency is roughly every 30 minutes, and makes short turns to destinations midway through the route during late nights.

References

External links

 Official website
 RFP for new buses

Bus transportation in Connecticut
Government agencies established in 1971
Transportation in Fairfield County, Connecticut
Bridgeport